Pedro Cachín (born 12 April 1995 in Bell Ville) is an Argentine professional tennis player. Cachín has a career high ATP singles ranking of world No. 54 achieved on 14 November 2022. He also has a career high ATP doubles ranking of world No. 219 achieved on 9 May 2022. Cachín had a career high Junior ranking of No. 8 achieved on 9 December 2013.

Professional career

2015-2019: ATP debut in doubles, First Challenger title 
Cachín made his ATP main draw doubles debut at the 2015 Argentina Open partnering Facundo Argüello.

Pedro Cachín entered his first Grand Slam tournament at the 2015 Wimbledon Championships, but was eliminated by Jimmy Wang 4–6, 6–3, 7–5 in the first qualifying round.

He would re-enter Wimbledon in 2019 and would again be eliminated in the first qualifying round by Tallon Griekspoor.

His first Roland Garros was in 2019 in which he was defeated by Elliot Benchetrit in the first qualifying round, 3–6, 6–1, 3–6.

He entered the 2019 US Open, but was eliminated by Blaž Kavčič in the first qualifying round, 1–6, 6–4, 1–6.

2020-2021: Second Challenger title, top 250 debut
In 2020, Cachín won the World Tennis Tour title in Paguera, Spain, beating Matthieu Perchicot in the final. 

In 2021, Cachín won the 2021 Open de Oeiras II, beating Nuno Borges in the final for his second Challenger title.

He reached the top 250 at world No. 239 on 29 November 2021.

2022: Major debut & first win, Four Challengers, US Open third round & top 60
In January 2022, he reached the second round of qualifying for the 2022 Australian Open.

Later in March 2022, Cachín recorded a win over former World No. 3 and 2020 US Open champion, World No. 50 Dominic Thiem at the 2022 Andalucía Challenger in Marbella en route to the final where he lost to Jaume Munar. 

He qualified at the 2022 French Open as lucky loser to make his Grand Slam singles main draw debut. He won his first match at a Grand Slam against fellow qualifier Norbert Gombos. As a result he made his top 150 debut in the rankings.

He made his top 100 debut after winning his fifth Challenger title in Todi at World No. 98 on 11 July 2022. He moved to No. 66 on 22 August 2022 after his sixth Challenger title in the  Dominican Republic.

At the US Open, Cachin entered the main draw as a direct entry and defeated Aljaž Bedene in five sets in a fifth set with a super 10-point tiebreak, becoming the first player to win at the US Open under the new tiebreak rule.
Next he defeated wildcard Brandon Holt again in five sets with a super tiebreak after being two sets down to move onto the third round for the first time at this Major and in his career. As a result he entered the top 60 in the rankings.

In October he faced Andy Murray in the round of 16 of the 2022 Gijón Open losing in the third set tiebreak.

At the ATP 500 2022 Erste Bank Open in Vienna, he entered the main draw as lucky loser.

He finished the year ranked in the top 60 at world No. 54 on 21 November 2022.

Performance timeline

Current through the 2022 French Open

Futures and Challenger career finals

Singles: 35 (15–20)

Doubles: 13 (8–5)

References

External links
 
 

1995 births
Living people
Argentine male tennis players
Sportspeople from Córdoba, Argentina
21st-century Argentine people